10:30 am Local Call  is an 2013 Indian Malayalam-language mystery film directed by Manu Sudhakaran and starring Nishan K. P. Nanaiah, Shritha Sivadas, Kailash, Lal, Mrudula Murali and Jennifer Antony playing a prominent role.

Plot
Alby works in a Nissan showroom. His wife, Ann, works as a radio jockey. Alby's old sweetheart, Nimmy enters his life when she is deserted by her husband, Vishnu, after he suspects her of an affair.  Alby is forced to take her to a homestay, where they share a room together. The story takes a sudden turn when Nimmy is found dead. Alby tries to move on with his life until he is disturbed by a call from a stranger at 10:30 AM local time. He is extorted into doing the commands of the caller, and finds himself disturbed doing those tasks. The story progresses with his journey to find out the truth behind all of his mishaps.

Cast

Soundtrack 
The film's soundtrack contains 2 songs, all composed by Gopi Sunder. Lyrics by Rafeeq Ahmed and Murukan Kattakada.

Reception
Sify wrote "For all those who are used to watching taut thrillers that leave you spellbound, 10.30 am Local Call could end up as a joke, at best. It is amateurish to the core, predictable and its making lacks any kind of imagination".

Indiaglitz wrote "10 30 am Local call has a decent and absorbing narrative and some good performances coupled with a fine technical side, soulful BG and music as its aces".
 
Veeyen from Nowrunning gave 2 stars and wrote "10.30 am Local Call lacks the very vital element of a thriller - that of a persuasive ground that would put in the final piece and complete the puzzle".

References

External links
 

2010s Malayalam-language films
Films scored by Gopi Sundar